Corybas dowlingii, commonly known as red lanterns, is a rare species of terrestrial orchid endemic to New South Wales. It grows in colonies and has a round or heart-shaped leaf and a dark purplish red flower with white patches in the labellum.

Description 
The leaf is dark green on the upper surface and slightly reddish on the lower side. The labellum is translucent white with red blotches and tube-shaped near its base. Flowering occurs from June to August.

Taxonomy 
Corybas dowlingii was first formally described in 2004 by David Jones from a specimen collected by Bill Dowling on Bulahdelah Mountain. The description was published in The Orchadian. The specific epithet (dowlingii) honours the collector of the type specimen.

Distribution and habitat
Red lanterns grows in gullies in tall forest and is only known from four localities between Bulahdelah, Port Stephens and Freemans Waterhole.

Conservation
This orchid is listed as "endangered" under the New South Wales Government Biodiversity Conservation Act 2016. It is threatened by land clearing and habitat degradation, rubbish dumping and recreational overuse.

References 

dowlingii
Endemic orchids of Australia
Orchids of New South Wales
Plants described in 2004